Eucalyptus porosa, commonly known as mallee box, Quorn mallee or water mallee, is a species of mallee or a tree that is endemic to southern Australia. It has rough, fibrous or flaky bark on the trunk and larger branches, smooth greyish bark above, lance-shaped adult leaves, flower buds in groups of seven, white flowers and barrel-shaped or shortened spherical fruit.

Description
It has rough, fibrous or flaky, greyish bark on the trunk or stems, smooth whitish or grey bark above. Flowering mainly occurs between October and March and the flowers are white.

Taxonomy and naming
Eucalyptus porosa was first formally described in 1856 by Friedrich Miquel from an unpublished description by Ferdinand von Mueller. Miquel's description was published in the journal Nederlandsch Kruidkundig Archief. The specific epithet (porosa) is from the Latin porosus meaning "pierced with small holes", referring to small holes in the anthers.

Distribution and habitat
Mallee box is widely distributed in the semi-arid regions of South Australia, north-western Victoria and south-western New South Wales. It grows in a variety of habitats including rocky ridges, coastal limestone, mallee shrubland and woodland.

See also
List of Eucalyptus species

References

porosa
Flora of New South Wales
Flora of South Australia
Flora of Victoria (Australia)
Plants described in 1856